The Juno Awards of 1986, representing Canadian music industry achievements of the previous year, were awarded on 10 November 1986 in Toronto at a ceremony hosted by Howie Mandel at the Harbour Castle Hilton Hotel. CBC Television broadcast the ceremonies nationally.

Labour problems at the Canadian Broadcasting Corporation overshadowed plans for the awards broadcast. NABET complained about CBC plans to hire two American technical workers to assist with a special effect during the broadcast. NABET was renegotiating a labour contract with CBC and felt that Canadians should have been hired instead.

Meanwhile, CBC workers with the CUPE stopped work on 7 November. This strike was temporary, but interrupted the work of some Juno stage hands who were members of that union. weekend. CUPE's workers returned to work on the day of the Junos broadcast, as this particular union action was not planned to continue past the weekend.

1600 public tickets were made available, but all were sold late September, approximately one month after the $170 CAD tickets were offered for sale.

Gordon Lightfoot entered Canadian Music Hall of Fame, and was introduced at the ceremonies by Bob Dylan who made a surprise appearance.

Nominees and winners

Female Vocalist of the Year
Winner: Luba

Other nominees:
 Carroll Baker
 Anne Murray
 Martine St. Clair
 Jane Siberry

Male Vocalist of the Year
Winner: Bryan Adams

Other nominees:
 Bruce Cockburn
 Kim Mitchell
 Gino Vannelli
 Neil Young

Most Promising Female Vocalist of the Year
Winner: Kim Richardson

Other nominees:
 Chantal Condor
 Siobhan Crawley
 Francesca Gagnon
 Sheree Jeacocke

Most Promising Male Vocalist of the Year
Winner: Billy Newton-Davis

Other nominees:
 Doug Cameron
 Michel Lemieux
 Stan Meissner
 Scott Merritt

Group of the Year
Winner: Honeymoon Suite

Other nominees:
 Loverboy
 Platinum Blonde
 Rush
 Triumph

Most Promising Group of the Year
Winner: Glass Tiger

Other nominees:
 Cats Can Fly
 Chalk Circle
 Eye Eye
 One to One

Composer of the Year
Winner: Jim Vallance

Other nominees:
 Bryan Adams
 David Foster
 Corey Hart
 Luba

Country Female Vocalist of the Year
Winner: Anne Murray

Other nominees:
 Carroll Baker
 Marie Bottrell
 Kelita
 Anne Lord

Country Male Vocalist of the Year
Winner: Murray McLauchlan

Other nominees:
 Eddie Eastman
 Gilles Godard]]
 [[Matt Minglewood
 Frank Trainor

Country Group or Duo of the Year
Winner: Prairie Oyster

Other nominees:
 Carroll Baker and Eddie Eastman
 C-Weed Band
 The Family Brown
 The Mercey Brothers

Instrumental Artist of the Year
Winner: David Foster

Other nominees:
 Liona Boyd
 Canadian Brass
 Moe Koffman
 Zamfir

Producer of the Year
Winner: David Foster, St. Elmo's Fire Soundtrack by various artists

Other nominees:
 Terry Brown, Just in Time to Be Late by Eye Eye
 Graeme Coleman, The Bohemians by Skywalk
 Leslie Howe, Forward Your Emotions by One to One
 David Tyson, The Lines are Open by The Arrows and The Key by Erroll Starr

Recording Engineer of the Year
Winner: Joe and Gino Vannelli, Black Cars by Gino Vannelli

Other nominees:
 Patrick Glover, "The Bohemians" by Skywalk
 Leslie Howe, "Forward Your Emotions" by One to One
 Mike Jones and Paul Northfield, "Don't Forget Me" and "Thin Red Line" by Glass Tiger
 Anton Kwiatkowski, "Holst: The Planets" by Toronto Symphony Orchestra, Andrew Davis conductor

Canadian Music Hall of Fame
Winner: Gordon Lightfoot

Walt Grealis Special Achievement Award
Winner: Jack Richardson

Nominated and winning albums

Album of the Year
Winner: The Thin Red Line, Glass Tiger

Other nominees:
 Alien Shores, Platinum Blonde
 Lovin' Every Minute of It, Loverboy
 Power Windows, Rush
 The Big Prize, Honeymoon Suite

Best Album Graphics
Winner: Hugh Syme and Dimo Safari, Power Windows by Rush

Other nominees:
 Heather Brown, Dean Motter, Deborah Samuel, Between the Earth & Sky by Luba
 Heather Brown, Hugh Syme, Peter Shelly, Robot Man and Friends by Peter Shelly
 Mark Gane, Martha Johnson, Dimo Safari, The World Is a Ball by M + M
 Allen Shechtman, Melosphere by Helmut Lipsky

Best Children's Album
Winner: 10 Carrot Diamond, Charlotte Diamond

Other nominees:
 A House For Me, Fred Penner
 Come on In, Eric Nagler
 Lots More Junior Jug Band, Chris Whiteley and Ken Whiteley
 Songs + Games For Toddlers, Bob McGrath and Katharine Smithrim

Best Classical Album of the Year - Solo or Chamber Ensemble
Winner: Stolen Gems, James Campbell (clarinet)

Other nominees:
 Au Verd Boys/To The Greenwood, New World Consort
 La Chanson Francaise, Songs of Medieval & Renaissance France, The Toronto Consort
 Louis Lortie Plays Maurice Ravel, Louis Lortie
 Vickers, Jon Vickers (tenor)

Best Classical Album of the Year - Large Ensemble or Soloist(s) With Large Ensemble Accompaniment
Winner: Holst: The Planets, Toronto Symphony Orchestra, Andrew Davis - Conductor]]

Other nominees:
 Franck: Symphony in D Minor & Berlioz: King Lear, Vancouver Symphony Orchestra, Kazuyoshi Akiyama conductor
 Great Verdi Arias, Edmonton Symphony Orchestra, Uri Mayer conductor, Louis Quilico baritone
 Schubert: Symphony No. 8 & Strauss: Metamorphosen, National Arts Centre Orchestra, Franco Mannino conductor
 Suppe: Overtures, Orchestre symphonique de Montreal, Charles Dutoit conductor

International Album of the Year
Winner: Brothers in Arms, Dire Straits

Other nominees:
 Afterburner, ZZ Top
 Heart, Heart
 Miami Vice soundtrack, various artists
 Scarecrow, John (Cougar) Mellencamp

Best Jazz Album
Winner: Lights of Burgundy, Oliver Jones

Other nominees:
 Atras De Porta, Rob McConnell and the Boss Brass
 Boss Brass & Woods, Rob McConnell and the Boss Brass featuring Phil Woods
 Doomsday Machine, Denny Christianson Big Band
 The Rob McConnell Sextet Old Friends/New Music, The Rob McConnell Sextet

Nominated and winning releases

Best Selling Single
Winner: "Don't Forget Me (When I'm Gone)", Glass Tiger

Other nominees:
 "Crying Over You", Platinum Blonde
 "Diana", Bryan Adams
 "Everything in My Heart", Corey Hart
 "L'Amour est dans tes yeux", Martine St. Clair

International Single of the Year
Winner: "Live Is Life", Opus

Other nominees:
 "Cherish", Kool & the Gang
 "Nikita", Elton John
 "Rock Me Amadeus", Falco
 "Say You, Say Me", Lionel Richie

Best R&B/Soul Recording of the Year
Winner: "Love is a Contact Sport", Billy Newton-Davis

Other nominees:
 "All in the Way", Liberty Silver
 "I Found a Love", Glen Ricketts
 "The Key", Erroll Starr
 "Right Here Is Where You Belong", Kenny Hamilton

Best Reggae/Calypso Recording
Winner: Revolutionary Tea Party, Lillian Allen

Other nominees:
 Free South Africa, Jayson
 Moonlight Lover, Ras Lee
 Night Rider, Messenjah
 No One Can Love Me Like You Do, George Banton

Best Video
Winner: Greg Masuak, "How Many (Rivers To Cross)" by Luba

Other nominees:
 Rob Quartly, "Cosmetics" by Gowan
 Rob Quartly, "Don't Forget Me (When I'm Gone)" by Glass Tiger
 Rob Quartly, "Harmony" by Ian Thomas
 Lorraine Segato, "Sexual Intelligence" by The Parachute Club

References 

 (multi-topic article - mention of Juno tickets sold out)

External links
Juno Awards site

1986
1986 music awards
1986 in Canadian music